Pope Pius V (r. 1566–1572) created 21 cardinals in three consistories.

March 6, 1566

 Michele Bonelli

March 24, 1568

 Diego de Espinosa
 Jérôme Souchier
 Gianpaolo Della Chiesa
 Antonio Carafa

May 17, 1570

 Marcantonio Maffei
 Gaspar Cervantes de Gaeta
 Giulio Antonio Santorio
 Pier Donato Cesi
 Carlo Grassi
 Charles d'Angennes de Rambouillet
 Felice Peretti di Montalto
 Giovanni Aldobrandini
 Girolamo Rusticucci
 Giulio Acquaviva d'Aragona
 Gaspar de Zúñiga y Avellaneda
 Nicolas de Pellevé
 Archangelo de' Bianchi
 Paolo Burali d'Arezzo
 Vincenzo Giustiniani
 Gian Girolamo Albani

References

Pius 5
16th-century Catholicism
Pope Pius V
College of Cardinals
 
Cardinals created by Pope Pius V